Jean-Blaise Evéquoz (born 27 November 1953) is a Swiss fencer. He won a bronze medal in the team épée event at the 1976 Summer Olympics.  He is also an artist with works on display with the Art of the Olympians.

References

External links
 

1953 births
Living people
Swiss male épée fencers
Olympic fencers of Switzerland
Fencers at the 1976 Summer Olympics
Olympic bronze medalists for Switzerland
Olympic medalists in fencing
Medalists at the 1976 Summer Olympics
20th-century Swiss people
21st-century Swiss people